Yevgeniy Medvedev (born 9 August 1985) is a water polo player of Kazakhstan. He was part of the Kazakhstani team at the  2015 World Aquatics Championships.

See also
 Kazakhstan at the 2015 World Aquatics Championships

References

Kazakhstani male water polo players
Living people
Place of birth missing (living people)
1985 births
Asian Games medalists in water polo
Water polo players at the 2006 Asian Games
Water polo players at the 2018 Asian Games
Asian Games gold medalists for Kazakhstan
Asian Games bronze medalists for Kazakhstan
Medalists at the 2006 Asian Games
Medalists at the 2018 Asian Games
Water polo players at the 2020 Summer Olympics
Olympic water polo players of Kazakhstan
21st-century Kazakhstani people